Night Life in Reno is a 1931 American pre-Code film directed by actor/screenwriter Raymond Cannon.

Cast 
Virginia Valli as June Wyatt
Jameson Thomas as John Wyatt
Dorothy Christy as Gwen Maynard
Arthur Housman as Roy Carlton
Dixie Lee as Dorothy
Clarence Wilson as Adrian Garrett
Carmelita Geraghty as Rita Carlton

External links 

1931 films
1931 crime drama films
1931 romantic drama films
American black-and-white films
American crime drama films
American romantic drama films
Films set in Reno, Nevada
FIlms directed by Raymond Cannon (actor)
1930s English-language films
1930s American films